"Cavender Is Coming" is episode 101 of the American television anthology series The Twilight Zone. It originally aired on May 25, 1962 on CBS.

Opening narration

The narration continues after Cavender is assigned as Agnes' guardian angel.

Plot
Angel Harmon Cavender is assigned to Agnes Grep, a clumsy woman routinely fired from work for her clumsy antics, and tasked with improving her life in 24 hours to earn his wings. As he has taken longer than any other angel to do so, failure in this case means demotion.

Cavender appears beside Agnes on her bus ride home and tries to prove he is her guardian angel by changing the bus into a horse and buggy, then a convertible, and finally back to a bus. Once at home, Agnes is greeted by cookie-loving kids and neighbors who sympathize with her ongoing work woes. When she enters her apartment, she finds Cavender on her couch.

He provides her a mansion, high society friends, and a large bank account to fund it all. Instead of bowling, her former social "high point", she finds herself hosting a lavish party. However, she is uncomfortably overwhelmed by the high society chatter, largely incomprehensible to her, and by the obsequious affections of the men. Cavender, meanwhile, indulges himself in alcoholic drinks.

Cavender wakes up on Agnes' mansion couch. He does not see Agnes anywhere and zaps himself to her old apartment, where she glumly tells him that none of her old apartment neighbors recognize her. She tells him she does not want to go back to the mansion and wants her old life back. Cavender argues against the idea, but eventually gives in and zaps her back to her normal life. With excitement, she greets and jokes with all her old friends. She thanks Cavender and he realizes that she is "the richest woman [he] know[s]" and that money does not necessarily equal happiness.

Cavender returns to Heaven to see his boss, who reprimands him for his behavior at the party and for making no change to Agnes' life. However, after looking down on Earth, the boss sees that though her circumstances are unchanged, Agnes is now happy. He realizes Cavender did complete his mission by making Agnes appreciate what she had, and instead of being demoted, he will now help "other deserving subjects". Cavender takes out a cigar and happily leaves the 3rd Celestial Division Angel Placement.

Closing narration

Cast
 Jesse White as Harmon Cavender
 Carol Burnett as Agnes Grep
 Howard Smith as Polk
 Frank Behrens as Stout
 Roy N. Sickner as Bus Driver
 Sandra Gould as Woman
 Donna Douglas as Woman #1
 Adrienne Marden as Woman #2
 Maurice Dallimore as Man

Episode notes
This episode was originally broadcast with a laugh track – the only Twilight Zone episode to feature one – because this episode was intended as a backdoor pilot for a regular comedy series featuring the Cavender character. The version included in The Twilight Zone – The Complete Definitive Collection DVD set has the laugh track removed. Reruns airing in the U.S. on Syfy and MeTV also have the laugh track removed as does the version on Netflix.

"Cavender Is Coming" bears strong similarities to the first-season episode "Mr. Bevis". Both episodes are comedies about guardian angels who try to help kindhearted but hapless human beings by giving them everything they think they desire, only to discover that the humans are happier with the way life had been previously. Both episodes were written by Rod Serling.

References
DeVoe, Bill. (2008). Trivia from The Twilight Zone. Albany, GA: Bear Manor Media. 
Grams, Martin. (2008). The Twilight Zone: Unlocking the Door to a Television Classic. Churchville, MD: OTR Publishing.

External links
 

1962 American television episodes
The Twilight Zone (1959 TV series season 3) episodes
Television pilots within series
Television pilots not picked up as a series
Television episodes written by Rod Serling
Television episodes about angels